The water polo events at the 2001 World Aquatics Championships were held from 18 to 29 July 2001, in Fukuoka, Japan.

Medal summary

Medal table

Medalists

References

 
2001
World Aquatics Championships
Water polo
Sports competitions in Fukuoka